The 2014 Catalunya GP2 Series round was a pair of motor races held on May 10 and 11, 2014 at the Circuit de Catalunya in Montmeló, Spain as part of the GP2 Series. It was the second round of the 2014 season. The race weekend supported the 2014 Spanish Grand Prix.

Stéphane Richelmi took pole position in the feature race, but Johnny Cecotto Jr. took the victory, ahead of DAMS' Jolyon Palmer and Carlin driver Felipe Nasr finished third. Tom Dillmann finished in eighth position, and thus started on pole for the sprint race. Nasr took his first GP2 Series win in the sprint race, ahead of Palmer and Dillmann.

Classification

Qualifying

Feature race

Notes:
 — René Binder and Conor Daly finished the race in seventh and seventeenth place respectively, but had twenty seconds added to their race time in lieu of failure to slow down under yellow flags during the event.
 — Stefano Coletti finished the race in twelfth place, but had twenty seconds added to his race time because he went off track under double yellow flags, compromising the marshal's safety.

Sprint race

Notes:
 — Daniël de Jong started the race from the pit lane after his car was released in an unsafe condition in the feature race.

Standings after the round
Sources:

Drivers' Championship standings

Teams' Championship standings

 Note: Only the top five positions are included for both sets of standings.

See also 
 2014 Spanish Grand Prix
 2014 Catalunya GP3 Series round

References

External links
 

2014 GP2 Series rounds
2014 in Spanish motorsport